Richard Bazley (born 28 November 1962 in Devon, England) is an Emmy Nominated Film Director. Although now a Director of Live Action and animation his background is in animation and his credits include Disney’s Pocahontas, Hercules, Tarzan and a Lead Animator and Sequence Director on celebrated Warner Bros. Film The Iron Giant. Bazley started his career on the ground breaking Who Framed Roger Rabbit.

Work
Bazley who works on both sides of the Atlantic set up Bazley Films in the US and UK and produced the animated short The Journal of Edwin Carp narrated by Hugh Laurie (House). It was the first animated short created in Flash to be released Theatrically. Bazley also Co-wrote Flash Cartoons and Games with James Robertson and Bill Turner.

Bazley moved into Directing on commercials and series with popular commercials for Sky  and Go Compare. In 2012 he Directed two Episodes of Full English at Rough Draft Studios (USA), a TV show made for the UK’s Channel Four (2012). On this Bazley teamed up with Alex Scarfe, the son of Gerald Scarfe with whom he had worked closely on Disney’s Hercules.

Through Argosy Film Group Bazley Directed the Lost Treasure Hunt, an animated half-hour pilot for a proposed TV Series. Lost Treasure Hunt was created by the award-winning feature animators behind Shrek, The Iron Giant, and Frozen. Combined with the work of nationally recognized educators and historians, Lost Treasure Hunt is a fast moving adventure and new type of history experience. In 2015 Bazley received two Emmy nominations for his work on the show.

Bazley developed several Feature films and is attached as Director. In 2011 Bazley teamed up with Gary Kurtz (Prod. Star Wars, Dark Crystal) and Paul Goodenough to set up the film production company 

based in London and Los Angeles. GBK Hybrid's first short Centurion Resurrection filmed in Bath has played at numerous Film Festivals and won numerous awards.

The Chimeran, a Live Action/Animation Hybrid is the first film in development. Described as somewhere between Planet of the Apes and District 9 this is clearly not just another creature movie. With Gary Kurtz’s involvement it ensures that the film has depth and character with many sociological issues that take it out of the realms of regular Sci Fi. It is grounded in real scientific theory, is thought-provoking, and relevant to the human condition. GBK Hybrid’s first animated offering is Offbeat, an animated musical about a parallel musical world inhabited by anthropomorphised note characters which the main character Pick has to bring back into Harmony.

In 2022 Bazley Directed the multi-award winning film 'Censure' featuring Tom Conti. To date the film has won over 40 awards.

Filmography

TV commercials

TV shows

Short films

Bibliography

References

External links 
 Interview published by The Film Maker's Workshop on 24 December 2014 on YouTube in which Richard Bazley talks about transitioning from animation to live action

1962 births
Living people
British animators
British animated film directors
British television directors